Events in the year 1886 in Japan. It corresponds to Meiji 19 (明治19年) in the Japanese calendar.

Incumbents
Monarch: Emperor Meiji
Prime Minister: Itō Hirobumi

Governors
Aichi Prefecture: Minoru Katsumata
Akita Prefecture: Akagawa then Sada Aoyama
Aomori Prefecture: Kyusei Fukushima then Nabeshima Miki
Ehime Prefecture: Shinpei Seki
Fukui Prefecture: Tsutomu Ishiguro
Fukuoka Prefecture: Yasujo
Fukushima Prefecture: Kinichi Akashi then Hiraochi Orita
Gifu Prefecture: Toshi Kozaki
Gunma Prefecture: Katori Yoshihiko
Hiroshima Prefecture: Senda Sadaaki
Ibaraki Prefecture: Shima then Sadanori Yasuda
Iwate Prefecture: Shoichiro Ishii
Kanagawa Prefecture: Baron Tadatsu Hayashi
Kochi Prefecture: Yoshiaki Tonabe
Kumamoto Prefecture: Yoshiaki Tonabe
Kyoto Prefecture: Baron Utsumi Tadakatsu
Mie Prefecture: Ishii Kuni
Miyagi Prefecture: Matsudaira Masanao
Miyazaki Prefecture: Teru Tananbe 
Nagano Prefecture: Baron Seiichiro Kinashi
Niigata Prefecture: Shinozaki Goro
Oita Prefecture: Ryokichi Nishimura
Okinawa Prefecture: Sadakiyo Osako then Minoru Fukuhara
Osaka Prefecture: Tateno Tsuyoshi
Saga Prefecture: Kamata
Saitama Prefecture: Kiyohide Yoshida
Shimane Prefecture: Sada Kotedayasu
Tochigi Prefecture: Sukeo Kabayama
Tokyo: Hiroshi Watanabe then Marquis Shigeru Hachisuke
Toyama Prefecture: Kunishige Masafuni then Fujishima Masaki
Yamagata Prefecture: Orita Hirauchi then Shibahara Sum

Events
January 26 - The Hokkaidō Agency opens, with its main office in Sapporo and branch offices in Hakodate and Nemuro.

Births
January 28 – Hidetsugu Yagi, electrical engineer (d. 1976)
February 10 – Raichō Hiratsuka, writer, journalist, political activist (d. 1971)
February 20 – Takuboku Ishikawa, poet (d. 1912)
February 23 – Yahiko Mishima, athlete (d. 1954)
May 20 – Chieko Takamura, artist (d. 1938)
June 9 – Kosaku Yamada, composer and conductor (d. 1965)
June 10 – Sessue Hayakawa, actor (d. 1973)
June 18 – Tsuruko Haraguchi,  psychologist and the first Japanese woman to receive a Doctor of Philosophy (d. 1915)
July 17 – Chizuko Mifune, clairvoyant (d. 1911)
July 20 – Misao Fujimura, student and poet (d. 1903)
July 24 –  Jun'ichirō Tanizaki, writer and novelist (d. 1965)
November 1
Sakutarō Hagiwara, writer (d. 1942)
Sumako Matsui, actress and singer (d. 1919)
November 27 – Tsuguharu Foujita, painter (d. 1968)

References

 
1880s in Japan
Japan
Years of the 19th century in Japan